Although the culture of Idaho is reflective of the broader culture of the United States to some extent, some of the forces that have shaped the more distinctive aspects of the Idaho culture are ethnographic, geographic, and historical in nature. Additionally, the culture of Idaho is reflected in the state's symbols, traditions, stories, art, and cuisine.

Ethnographic influences 
Idaho is home to several immigrant groups with notable histories. Specifically, Idaho is home to significant numbers of people with historical British, Native American, German, and Mexican historical ties. The Native peoples of north Idaho are of different language backgrounds and separate from the Uto-Aztecan peoples of the Great Basin and the Shoshoni tribes of southern Idaho.  Among them the Nez Perces in the Clearwater and lower Salmon River welcomed the Lewis and Clark Expedition in the early 1800s. The Spalding Mission influenced greatly the subsequent history of the people in this area. The first major influx of European-Americans in the south came from Utah, comprising Mormons who needed more land after the Salt Lake Valley became inhabited. To this day LDS churches and the Mormon culture are predominant in the daily life and customs of south-east counties. In general the popular culture of the south of the State is shared with other inland Western states that developed out of cattle and sheep ranching, the "cowboy culture" of the late 19th C. Few ethnic enclaves have developed, although Boise and its environs have more people of Basque ancestry than anywhere outside the Western Pyrenees. For the most part, people live in mixed neighborhoods and carry on ethnic customs in their homes or churches.

Cultural centers in the Treasure Valley region of southern Idaho include the Hispanic Cultural Center of Idaho and the Basque Center in downtown Boise.  Another cultural site is the Minidoka Relocation Camp site, near Hagerman, which housed many Japanese-Americans during World War II in a concentration camp, from which the small but significant population of Japanese-Americans in the Snake River Valley mostly resettled starting in 1946.

Idaho takes great pride in its potato farming, mass producing 322,000 potatoes each year in the Snake River Lava Plateau.  The agricultural basis of the economy influences many aspects of the local culture, politics and activities.

Geographic influences 

Geography has shaped the Idahoan identity, imprinting aesthetic and recreational aspects upon the culture. For example, consider that the world's first chairlift was built in Sun Valley and that skiing is cherished as an Idaho pastime. Additionally, the rivers and high mountain lakes of Idaho contribute to a rich fishing culture within the state. The significance of Idaho's fishing culture is partly revealed by the impact of fishing recreation on the economy of Idaho.

There are variations arising from geography that impact culture. For example, the state features some areas that could be classified as urban (such as Boise), and others that could be classified as decidedly rural.

Historical influences 

In examining historical influences upon the culture of Idaho, the effect of Mormon and European settlers holds a notable position.

References